Knyaz-Yelga (Kenäzyılğa) is a rural locality (a village) in Akkuzevsky Selsoviet, Ilishevsky District, Bashkortostan, Russia. The population was 59 as of 2010. There are 3 streets.

Geography 
Knyaz-Yelga is located 28 km northwest of Verkhneyarkeyevo (the district's administrative centre) by road. Shammetovo is the nearest rural locality.

References 

Rural localities in Ilishevsky District